Robert Minge Mokaya  is a Kenyan-British chemist who is Professor of Materials Chemistry and Pro-Vice-Chancellor for Global Engagement at the University of Nottingham. Mokaya holds a Royal Society Wolfson Merit Award.

Early life and education 
Mokaya was born in Kenya. He attended the University of Nairobi, where he specialised in chemistry. After graduating he joined Unilever in Kenya. He moved to the University of Cambridge for his graduate studies, where he worked in the laboratory of William "Bill" Jones. After graduating, Mokaya was awarded a junior research fellowship, and started his independent career at Trinity College, Cambridge.

Research and career 
In 1996 Mokaya was named an Engineering and Physical Sciences Research Council Advanced Fellow, and by 2000 he had been made a lecturer at the University of Nottingham. In 2008 he was appointed Professor of Materials Chemistry. In 2017 Mokaya was awarded a Royal Society Wolfson Research Merit Award.

He investigates novel materials for carbon sequestration, focussing primarily on hydrogen fuel cells. Mokaya considers porous materials and their structure-property relationships. Nanostructured porous materials contain significant internal volume, which can be used for enhanced gas storage. Amongst these, Mokaya has studied mesoporous molecular sieves, porous carbons and zeolite templated carbons. He forms the nanoporous carbons by filling organic materials into porous inorganic structures, then heating them to the temperature at which they turn into pure carbon.

Mokaya was appointed Pro Vice-Chancellor for Global Engagement at the University of Nottingham in 2019. He was part of a Royal Society programme to strengthen the capacity of African researchers to design, synthesise and optimise porous materials.

He was appointed Officer of the Order of the British Empire (OBE) in the 2022 New Year Honours for services to the chemical sciences.

 Mokaya is the only black chemistry professor in the United Kingdom and stated that UK Research and Innovation has rejected all of his funding applications.

Selected publications

References 

Kenyan chemists
Alumni of Trinity College, Cambridge
Academics of the University of Nottingham
University of Nairobi alumni
Year of birth missing (living people)
Living people
Kenyan emigrants to the United Kingdom
Naturalised citizens of the United Kingdom
Officers of the Order of the British Empire
British chemists